James Cline Quayle (May 25, 1921 – July 7, 2000) was an American newspaper publisher and businessman who owned several newspapers in the United States including the Huntington Herald-Press in Indiana and the Wickenburg Sun in Arizona.  He was the father of Dan Quayle, the 44th vice president of the United States.

Early life
Quayle was born in Joliet, Illinois, the son of Robert H. and Marie Cline Quayle. He attended DePauw University, where he was a member of Delta Kappa Epsilon. After graduating in 1943, Quayle joined the United States Marine Corps and served in an air transport wing in the Pacific Theater during World War II.

Family
After the war, Quayle married Corinne Pulliam, the daughter of wealthy newspaper publisher Eugene C. Pulliam, at Indiana University. Their marriage united two families that shared a strong passion for the newspaper business. Pulliam is the daughter of Eugene C. Pulliam, former owner of The Indianapolis Star and The Indianapolis News and the half-sister of Eugene S. Pulliam, for whom the school of journalism at Butler University is named. The couple had four children, including future Indiana Senator and U.S. Vice-President James Danforth "Dan" Quayle, named after one of the elder Quayle's wartime comrades and fraternity brother.

Career
James Quayle entered the newspaper business serving as an advertising salesman for several Pulliam-owned newspapers in Indiana and Ohio before joining the Huntington Herald-Press in Huntington, Indiana in 1948. In 1955, Quayle moved his family to Arizona to manage public relations operations at The Arizona Republic and the Phoenix Gazette.

Publisher
In 1963, Quayle became the publisher of the Huntington Herald-Press. He purchased the newspaper the following year and became chairman of Huntington Newspapers, Inc. He was publisher of that newspaper from 1963 to 1990, except for six years when he was publisher of the Muncie Star and Evening Press, beginning in 1972.

Death
After retiring, Quayle lived in Wickenburg, Arizona, where he died in 2000, aged 79.

References

External links
 

1921 births
2000 deaths
United States Marine Corps personnel of World War II
20th-century American newspaper publishers (people)
American people of Manx descent
DePauw University alumni
Fathers of vice presidents of the United States
People from Huntington, Indiana
Military personnel from Joliet, Illinois
People from Wickenburg, Arizona
People from Muncie, Indiana
Dan Quayle
Pulliam family
Quayle family
Journalists from Illinois
Journalists from Arizona
Journalists from Indiana
20th-century American journalists
American male journalists